Royal Bled Golf Club is a 27-hole golf facility in the Municipality of Radovljica in the Upper Carniola region of Slovenia.

History 

In the second half of the 19th century the historical town of Bled, famous for glacial Lake Bled and the iconic Bled Castle perched on a rock overlooking the lake, developed into a health resort, attracting nobility and wealthy guests from all across Europe. King Alexander I of Yugoslavia chose Bled as his summer residence in 1922, due to its mild climate.

Austrian Rudolf von Gelmini designed the original layout and in 1937 the first nine holes of the course was completed, marking the birth of golf in the region. In 1938 it became the only 18-hole course in Yugoslavia prior to the Second World War. After the outbreak of the WWII, the course was largely abandoned until its resurrection by Donald Harradine in 1972.

In 2014, Howard Swan was commissioned by new owners to bring the course up to modern standards while respecting the original heritage. In 2017, the King's course reopened after a 2-year renovation that saw considerable updates made to the original layout. At a combined 80th anniversary and re-opening ceremony, Princess Elizabeth of Yugoslavia hit the first ceremonial shot  and bestowed Royal status upon the club.

The facility comprises the 7,275 yard 18-hole Championship King's Course, and the 3,332 yard 9-hole Lake Course.

In 2020, Golf Digest ranked the course the best in Slovenia.

Notable tournaments hosted
The club has hosted both amateur and professional international championships, including the Slovenian Open.

Professional

Amateur 
European Boys' Team Championship – 19972008
European Mid-Amateur Men's Championship – 2005
European Senior Men's Team Championship – 2007
European Ladies' Team Championship – 2009
European Senior Ladies' Team Championship – 2013
European Senior Ladies' Championship – 2018

References

External links

Golf clubs and courses in Slovenia
Royal golf clubs